The women's 400 metre individual medley event at the 2020 Summer Olympics was held on 24 and 25 July 2021 at the Tokyo Aquatics Centre. It will be the event's fifteenth consecutive appearance, having been held at every edition since 1964.

Records
Prior to this competition, the existing world and Olympic records were as follows.

No new records were set during the competition.

Qualification

 
The Olympic Qualifying Time for the event is 4:38.53. Up to two swimmers per National Olympic Committee (NOC) can automatically qualify by swimming that time at an approved qualification event. The Olympic Selection Time is 4:46.89. Up to one swimmer per NOC meeting that time is eligible for selection, allocated by world ranking until the maximum quota for all swimming events is reached. NOCs without a female swimmer qualified in any event can also use their universality place.

Competition format
The competition consists of two rounds: heats and a final. The swimmers with the best 8 times in the heats advance to the final. Swim-offs are used as necessary to break ties for advancement to the next round.

Schedule
All times are Japan Standard Time (UTC+9)

Results

Heats
The swimmers with the top 8 times, regardless of heat, advance to the final.

Final

References

Women's 00400 metre individual medley
Olympics
Women's events at the 2020 Summer Olympics
2021 in women's swimming